Sir Benedict Obidinma Odinamadu (14 July 1927 – 8 November 1979) was a civil servant. He was the private Secretary to Dr. Nnamdi Azikiwe., Dr. M.I. Okpara while Premiers of Eastern Region of Nigeria respectively and First Secretary to the Military Government of Colonel Emeka Odumegwu Ojukwu.

Biography 
He was born in Abatete town in Idemili North Local Government Area of Anambra State of Nigeria on 14 July 1927. He was the first son of Mr. John Chukwuemeka Odinamadu and Mrs. Lucy Odinamadu née Oranu, both of Abatete.

Education 
Odinamadu grew up at the various Nigeria Police Force barracks in Onitsha, Bansara, Ikom, Nsukka and Enugu where his father was posted. He received his elementary school education at St. Joseph's Catholic School, Nsukka and St. Patrick's Catholic School, Ogbete, Enugu. He received his secondary school education at Christ the King College, Onitsha. He studied at University College, Ibadan where he graduated with second class honors (upper division) in History and Political Thought, of London University in 1956.

From 1960 to 1966, he took various administrative management courses in Washington D.C. U.S.A, Ottawa, Canada, Puerto Rico, the Caribbean.

From 1964 to 1965, he studied Regional Development in Southern Italy and Economic Development Institute of the International Bank for Development and Reconstruction (World Bank) in Washington D.C., U.S. He was elected fellow of the institute.

Career 
He was the private secretary to Dr. Nnamdi Azikiwe, Dr. Michael I. Okpara while Premier of Eastern Region, Nigeria respectively.

In 1964, he served on the board of directors Calabar Cement Co. Ltd.

In 1965, he was promoted to the position of permanent secretary. In 1966, he became the First Secretary to the Military Government of Colonel Chukwuemeka Odumegwu Ojukwu. Subsequently, he became the permanent secretary of the Ministry of Information during the tense period of negotiations for unity and indivisibility of Nigeria at Aburi, Ghana. Afterwards, Permanent Secretary of Ministry of Education (1966)

In 1967, Odinamadu was appointed Secretary/Chief Executive of the Petroleum Management Board. This body was setup by Colonel Chukwuemeka Odumegwu Ojukwu to take charge and manage Shell B.P. assets for the Republic of Biafra. He held this post until the end of the Nigeria-Biafra civil war. He also served as Permanent Secretary of Ministry of Information, Ministry of Education etc.

After the Nigeria-Biafra civil war, he continued to serve as Permanent Secretary in the Ministries of Health, Agriculture, Trade and Transport etc.. until 1975. Some of his postings earned him the nickname "Crisis Permsec".

He was the Chairman of Co-operative Bank of Eastern Nigeria in 1974.

In 1975, after the coup d'état that removed General Gowon as Head of State and installed the late General Murtala Muhammed, Odinamadu was dismissed by Colonel Anthony Aboki Ochefu during the purge that followed that coup. No reason for the dismissal.

Between October 1975 and December 1977, he appeared before eight Commissions of Inquiry and Assets Commission of Inquiry. All returned the same favorable verdict;  that Ben Odinamadu was a man of integrity.

In September 1979, the dismissal order was lifted by a decision of the Supreme Military Council and his retirement benefits (gratuity and pension) were paid in full.

Marriage and family 
He married Oyibo Ekwulo Akwuba in September 1957; and they have four children – two boys and two girls. Oyibo Ekwulo Odinamadu died on March 30, 2022. Children: Kenneth Osita Odinamadu, Ijeoma Emejulu (Mrs.), Emeka Odinamadu and Ifeatu Onubogu (Mrs.).

Private entrepreneurship 
He started the Pelican Transport Company for Road Haulage and the John Kenneth Nigeria Limited for importation of goods.

Political party activities 
In 1978, he joined the Unity Party of Nigeria led by Chief Obafemi Awolowo (now late).

Recognitions 
He was installed as member of the Order of the Knighthood of St. Mulumba (KSM) in 1978 by His Lordship the Most Reverend M.A. Eneja.

Literary interests 
Odinamadu's essays were published posthumously in 1980 by his widow Oyibo Ekwulo Odinamadu in a book entitled: POLITICS AND THE IGBO ELITE. 
He published an article in the Newspaper Daily Star 4 Nov 1978: The Dilemma of the Igbo Political Elite

Leisure activities 
Odinamadu played chess, lawn tennis, draughts and scrabble. He was a swimmer.

He was a member of the Enugu Sports Club.

He was a fan of Rangers International Football Club, Enugu.

He was a member of Rotary Club International, Enugu and became the President in 1977.

Chieftaincy titles 
He was a member of the prestigious Nze na OZO Society. His social name NNABUENYI.

References

1927 births
1979 deaths